Wildcat 12 is a Mi'kmaq reserve located in Queens County, Nova Scotia. The population was 33 in 2011.

It is administratively part of the Acadia First Nation.

Indian reserves in Nova Scotia
Communities in Queens County, Nova Scotia
Mi'kmaq in Canada